The Unitarian Society or Unitarian Society may refer to:

Unitarian Society (Fall River), an historic church building in Fall River, Massachusetts
First Unitarian Society (disambiguation)
First Unitarian Society of Madison, a Unitarian Universalist congregation in Shorewood Hills, Madison, Wisconsin
First Unitarian Society in Newton, West Newton, Newton, Massachusetts
First Unitarian Congregational Society, a Unitarian Universalist congregation in Brooklyn, New York
Unitarian Universalist Religious Society of Spain, an attempt to organize Unitarian Universalism in Spain